Zucca may refer to:

People 
 André Zucca
 Giovanni Zucca
 Jacopo del Zucca
 Mana-Zucca
 Rita Zucca
 Vittorio Zucca

Other uses
 Zucca, a synonym of the genus Momordica
 Zucca (aperitif)